David Doctorian (November 9, 1934 – January 12, 2023) was an American politician who served in the Missouri Senate from the 28th district from 1977 to 1991.

Doctorian died on January 12, 2023, at the age of 88.

References

1934 births
2023 deaths
Politicians from Beirut
Republican Party Missouri state senators